Following are the categorized lists of the named Buddhas in Buddhist Scriptures. Out of innumerable Buddhas existing or have existed in the universe, Buddhist scripture provides names and description about many Buddhas.

Twenty Nine Buddhas 

The Pali literature of the Theravāda tradition includes tales of 29 Buddhas. In countries where Theravāda Buddhism is practiced by the majority of people, such as Sri Lanka, Cambodia, Laos, Myanmar, Thailand, it is customary for Buddhists to hold elaborate festivals, especially during the fair weather season, paying homage to the 29 Buddhas described in the Buddhavamsa. The Buddhavamsa is a text which describes the life of Gautama Buddha and the 27 Buddhas who preceded him, along with the future Metteyya Buddha. The Buddhavamsa is part of the Khuddaka Nikāya, which in turn is part of the Sutta Piṭaka. The Sutta Piṭaka is one of three main sections of the Pāli Canon.

The first three of these Buddhas—Taṇhaṅkara, Medhaṅkara, and Saraṇaṅkara—lived before the time of Dīpankara Buddha. The fourth Buddha, Dīpankara, is especially important, as he was the Buddha who gave niyatha vivarana (prediction of future Buddhahood) to the Brahmin youth who would in the distant future become the bodhisattva Gautama Buddha. After Dīpankara, 25 more noble people (ariya-puggala) would attain enlightenment before Gautama, the historical Buddha.

Many Buddhists also pay homage to the future (and 29th) Buddha, Metteyya. According to Buddhist scripture, Metteya will be a successor of Gautama who will appear on Earth, achieve complete enlightenment, and teach the pure Dharma. The prophecy of the arrival of Metteyya is found in the canonical literature of all Buddhist sects (Theravada, Mahayana, and Vajrayana), and is accepted by most Buddhists as a statement about an event that will take place when the Dharma will have been forgotten on Jambudvipa (terrestrial plane where ordinary humans live / earth ).

Thirty-five Confession Buddhas 
The names of the 35 Buddhas of confession differ depending on the sutra. A common classification in Tibetan Buddhism is as follows:

In Tantric Buddhism 

In Tantric Buddhism (Vajrayana), one finds some of the same Mahayana Buddhas along with other Buddha figures which are unique to Vajrayana. There are five primary Buddhas known as the "Five Tathagathas": Vairocana, Aksobhya, Ratnasambhava, Amitābha, and Amoghasiddhi. Each is associated with a different consort, direction, aggregate (or, aspect of the personality), emotion, element, color, symbol, and mount. Buddhist Tantra also includes several female Buddhas, such as Tara, the most popular female Buddha in Tibetan Buddhism, who comes in many forms and colors.

In the tantras, there are various fierce deities which are tantric forms of the Buddhas. These may be fierce (Tibetan: trowo, Sanskrit: krodha) Buddha forms or semi-fierce, and may appear in sexual union with a female Buddha or as a "solitary hero". The Herukas (Tb. khrag 'thung, lit. "blood drinker") are enlightened masculine beings who adopt fierce forms to help beings. They include Yamantaka, Cakrasamvara, Hevajra, Mahākāla, and Vajrakilaya. Dakinis (Tb. khandroma, "sky-goer") are their feminine counterparts, sometimes depicted with a heruka and sometimes as independent deities. The most prevalent wrathful dakinis are Vajrayogini, Vajravārāhī,  Nairatmya, and Kurukullā.

Buddhist mythology overlapped with Hindu mythology. Akshobhya, for example, acquires a fierce Tantric form that is reminiscent of the fierce form of the Hindu god Shiva; in this form he became known by the Buddhist names Heruka, Hevajra, or Samvara. He is known in Japan in this guise as Fudō (“Imperturbable”). The Indian god Bhairava, a fierce bull-headed divinity, was adopted by Tantric Buddhists as Vajrabhairava. Also called Yamantaka (“Slayer of Death”) and identified as the fierce expression of the gentle Manjushri, he was accorded quasi-buddha rank.

There is also the idea of the Adi-Buddha, the "first Buddha" to attain Buddhahood. Variously named as Vajradhara, Samantabhadra and  Vairocana, the first Buddha is also associated with the concept of Dharmakaya. Some historical figures are also seen as Buddhas, such as the Buddhist philosopher Nagarjuna, Tibetan historical figures like Padmasambhava, and Tsongkhapa.

Five Tathagatas

See also

List of bodhisattvas
Ten Bodhisattas
Thirty-five Confession Buddhas
Praises to the Twenty-One Taras
Bhadrakalpikasutra
List of Buddha claimants
Glossary of Buddhism
Buddha-nature
Enlightenment in Buddhism
Eternal Buddha
Physical characteristics of the Buddha

Notes

Footnotes

References

 
 
 
 
Buswell, Robert, ed. (2004), Encyclopedia of Buddhism, MacMIllan reference USA

External links

BuddhaNet

 
Buddhist philosophy